The 3rd arrondissement of Marseille is one of the 16 arrondissements of Marseille. It is governed locally together with the 2nd arrondissement, with which it forms the 2nd sector of Marseille.

Population

Education

Ecole et Collège Saint-Mauront, a private Catholic elementary and junior high school, is in the 3rd arrondissement.

References

External links
 Official website
 Dossier complet, INSEE

3rd arrondissement of Marseille
03